The Martyrdom of Saint Bartholomew is a 1634 painting by Jusepe de Ribera.

History 
Nothing is known of its provenance before its purchase around 1810 by Richard Barré Dunning, Lord Ashburton to give to George Cranstoun, Lord Corehouse, his uncle-in-law. It passed down through the Cranstoun family until being sold at Sotheby's in 1983. It was then sold from another private collection in 1990 to the National Gallery of Art in Washington, where it now hangs.

References 

1634 paintings
Paintings by Jusepe de Ribera
Collections of the National Gallery of Art
Torture in art
Paintings of Bartholomew the Apostle